Farsa is a genre of opera associated with Venice.

Farsa or FARSA may also refer to:
 Farsa, Greece, a village on the island of Kefalonia, Greece
 Fénius Farsaid, a legendary king of Scythia also known as Phenius Farsa
 Flight Attendants and Related Services Association (FARSA), a national trade union in New Zealand
 FARSA (gene) (Phenylalanyl-tRNA synthetase alpha chain), an enzyme found in humans

See also
 La farsa amorosa, an opera by Italian composer Riccardo Zandona